Soto del Barco (variant: San Pedro) is one of five parishes (administrative divisions) in Soto del Barco, a municipality within the province and autonomous community of Asturias, in northern Spain.  

Villages
 Caseras
 El Castillu
 Fancubierta
 La Florida
 El Forcón
 Llagu
 La Llana
 La Madalena
 La Marrona

References

Parishes in Soto del Barco